Jason Carthen (born November 16, 1970) is a retired American football player, an academic, radio personality, bestselling author, and public speaker. He was inducted into the Business and Leadership Hall of Fame in 2018. He was also named the 2018 Alumnus of the year by Regent University for his contributions to entrepreneurship and business. He is president and CEO of Jason Carthen Enterprises LLC. and founder of Speak Life University and The I Speak Life Academy. Carthen is the creator and host of the hit radio show Discover the Leader in You that airs nationally each week on iHeart Radio and iTunes. He is the past host of the television show Joy in our Town, and TBN's Praise the Lord.

Early life 
Born in rural Decatur, Alabama, in a single parent household, Carthen later lived in Toledo Ohio. He graduated from Scott High School in Toledo, Ohio, in 1989.

Football

High school 
Carthen played on the offensive side of the ball while in high school. As a tight end, he received All City, All Conference and Honorable Mention All State recognition. Carthen also lettered in basketball and tennis during his high school career.

College 
Carthen selected Ohio University where he played from 1989 through 1992. He was selected All-Conference in his Junior and Senior seasons. He was also voted team MVP his senior year and is the all-time leader in sacks (Record broken in 2016), tackles-for-Loss and caused fumbles.

Professional 
Carthen had a three-year career in the National Football League from 1993 to 1995 as an outside linebacker. He was injured in 1995 after signing a free-agent contract offer with the Jacksonville Jaguars.  He played one more year in NFL Europe with the Rhein Fire (Düsseldorf, Germany) from 1996 to 1997, where he led the league in special-teams tackles.

Entrepreneur 
In 2002, Carthen formed Redeemed Management & Consulting, an organizational consulting firm. Carthen served for over two decades in both the public and private sectors of Leadership and Business Management, specifically with the National Football League Players Association and The Leaders of Tomorrow Initiative.

Radio and television 
From 2009 to 2011, Carthen served as a host for WDLI, where he regularly appeared on Joy in Our Town and Praise the Lord. Prior to TBN, Carthen appeared as a guest on ABC and NBC, as well as ESPN, where he was a contributor to the Outside the Lines television show. In January 2010, he created his weekly podcast The Leadership Minute.

Philanthropist 
Carthen is a proponent of civic engagement, social justice and youth advocacy. He founded the Leaders of Tomorrow Initiativehttps://thelotinitiative.org/, a non-profit organization aiming to educate underprivileged youth about leadership, character and civic responsibilities. In 2008, he started a mentoring program that uses his own curriculum The T.I.E.S. that Bind to increase leadership capacities, character development, school engagement and reading skills among high school and college students.

Academia 
In the fall of 2006, Carthen joined the faculty of Bethel University as an adjunct professor of Leadership Studies. Carthen's research focuses upon motivation, hope, optimism, and positive psychology.

Distinctions 
Most recently Dr. Carthen was inducted into the Business and Leadership Hall of Fame in 2018. He was also named the 2018 Alumnus of the year by Regent University for his contributions to entrepreneurship and business. In 2017 Carthen was recognized by Forbes and other media publications as one of the top leadership and business coaches in the country. Carthen was recognized by the U.S. House of Representatives for his contribution to the leadership coaching profession.  Carthen is a distinguished Fellow in the Beta Phi academic & literary society and has been featured in Harvard Business for his consultancy work.

Books

Journal articles

References

External links
 Official website
 The Leaders of Tomorrow Initiative
 Redeemed Management and Consulting

Players of American football from Alabama
1970 births
Living people
Sportspeople from Decatur, Alabama
Rhein Fire players
People from Aurora, Ohio